A noun is a word that generally functions as the name of a specific object or set of objects, such as living creatures, places, actions, qualities, states of existence, or ideas.

Lexical categories (parts of speech) are defined in terms of the ways in which their members combine with other kinds of expressions.  The syntactic rules for nouns differ between languages. In English, nouns are those words which can occur with articles and attributive adjectives and can function as the head of a noun phrase. "As far as we know, every language makes a grammatical distinction that looks like a noun verb distinction."

History 

Word classes (parts of speech) were described by Sanskrit grammarians from at least the 5th century BC. In Yāska's Nirukta, the noun (nāma) is one of the four main categories of words defined.

The Ancient Greek equivalent was ónoma (ὄνομα), referred to by Plato in the Cratylus dialog, and later listed as one of the eight parts of speech in The Art of Grammar, attributed to Dionysius Thrax (2nd century BC). The term used in Latin grammar was nōmen. All of these terms for "noun" were also words meaning "name". The English word noun is derived from the Latin term, through the Anglo-Norman noun.

The word classes were defined partly by the grammatical forms that they take. In Sanskrit, Greek and Latin, for example, nouns are categorized by gender and inflected for case and number. Because adjectives share these three grammatical categories, adjectives are placed in the same class as nouns.

Similarly, the Latin nōmen includes both nouns (substantives) and adjectives, as originally did the English word noun, the two types being distinguished as nouns substantive and nouns adjective (or substantive nouns and adjective nouns, or short substantives and adjectives). (The word nominal is now sometimes used to denote a class that includes both nouns and adjectives.)

Many European languages use a cognate of the word substantive as the basic term for noun (for example, Spanish sustantivo, "noun"). Nouns in the dictionaries of such languages are demarked by the abbreviation s. or sb. instead of n., which may be used for proper nouns or neuter nouns instead. In English, some modern authors use the word substantive to refer to a class that includes both nouns (single words) and noun phrases (multiword units, also called noun equivalents). It can also be used as a counterpart to attributive when distinguishing between a noun being used as the head (main word) of a noun phrase and a noun being used as a noun adjunct. For example, the noun knee can be said to be used substantively in my knee hurts, but attributively in the patient needed knee replacement.

Examples 
 The cat sat on the chair.
 Please hand in your assignments by the end of the week.
 Cleanliness is next to godliness.
 Plato was an influential philosopher in ancient Greece.
 Revel the night, rob, murder, and commit/The oldest sins the newest kind of ways? Henry IV Part 2, act 4 scene 5.

A noun can co-occur with an article or an attributive adjective. Verbs and adjectives cannot. In the following, an asterisk (*) in front of an example means that this example is ungrammatical.

 the name (name is a noun:  can co-occur with a definite article the)
 *the baptise (baptise is a verb: cannot co-occur with a definite article)
 constant circulation (circulation  is a noun: can co-occur with the attributive adjective constant)
 *constant circulate (circulate  is a verb: cannot co-occur with the attributive adjective constant)
 a fright (fright is a noun: can co-occur with the indefinite article a)
 *an afraid (afraid is an adjective: cannot co-occur with the article a)
 terrible fright (the noun fright can co-occur with the adjective terrible)
 *terrible afraid (the adjective afraid cannot co-occur with the adjective terrible)

Definitions 

Nouns have sometimes been defined in terms of the grammatical categories to which they are subject (classed by gender, inflected for case and number). Such definitions tend to be language-specific, since nouns do not have the same categories in all languages.

Nouns are frequently defined, particularly in informal contexts, in terms of their semantic properties (their meanings). Nouns are described as words that refer to a person, place, thing, event, substance, quality, quantity, etc. However, this type of definition has been criticized by contemporary linguists as being uninformative.

There are several instances of English-language nouns which do not have any reference: drought, enjoyment, finesse, behalf (as found in on behalf of), dint (in dint of), and sake (for the sake of). Moreover, there may be a relationship similar to reference in the case of other parts of speech: the verbs to rain or to mother; many adjectives, like red; and there is little difference between the adverb gleefully and the noun-based phrase with glee.

Linguists often prefer to define nouns (and other lexical categories) in terms of their formal properties. These include morphological information, such as what prefixes or suffixes they take, and also their syntax – how they combine with other words and expressions of particular types. Such definitions may nonetheless still be language-specific since syntax as well as morphology varies between languages. For example, in English, it might be noted that nouns are words that can co-occur with definite articles (as stated at the start of this article), but this would not apply in Russian, which has no definite articles.

A functional approach defines a noun as a word that can be the head of a nominal phrase, i.e. a phrase with referential function, without needing to go through morphological transformation.

Classification 
Nouns can have a number of different properties and are often sub-categorized based on various of these criteria, depending on their occurrence in a language.

Gender 

In some languages, genders are assigned to nouns, such as masculine, feminine and neuter. The gender of a noun (as well as its number and case, where applicable) will often entail agreement in words that modify or are related to it. Grammatical gender often correlates with the form of the noun and the inflection pattern it follows; for example, in both Italian and Russian most nouns ending  are feminine. Gender can also correlate with the sex of the noun's referent, particularly in the case of nouns denoting people (and sometimes animals). Nouns arguably do not have gender in Modern English, although many of them denote people or animals of a specific sex (or social gender), and pronouns that refer to nouns must take the appropriate gender for that noun. (The girl lost her spectacles.)

Proper and common nouns 

A proper noun or proper name is a noun representing unique entities (such as India, Pegasus, Jupiter, Confucius, or Pequod), as distinguished from common nouns, which describe a class of entities (such as country, animal, planet, person or ship).

Countable nouns and mass nouns 

Count nouns or countable nouns are common nouns that can take a plural, can combine with numerals or counting quantifiers (e.g., one, two, several, every, most), and can take an indefinite article such as a or an (in languages which have such articles). Examples of count nouns are chair, nose, and occasion.

Mass nouns or uncountable (or non-count) nouns differ from count nouns in precisely that respect: they cannot take plurals or combine with number words or the above type of quantifiers.  For example, it is not possible to refer to a furniture or three furnitures. This is true even though the pieces of furniture comprising furniture could be counted. Thus the distinction between mass and count nouns should not be made in terms of what sorts of things the nouns refer to, but rather in terms of how the nouns present these entities.

Many nouns have both countable and uncountable uses; for example, soda is countable in "give me three sodas", but uncountable in "he likes soda".

Collective nouns 

Collective nouns are nouns that – even when they are inflected for the singular – refer to groups consisting of more than one individual or entity. Examples include committee, government, and police. In English these nouns may be followed by a singular or a plural verb and referred to by a singular or plural pronoun, the singular being generally preferred when referring to the body as a unit and the plural often being preferred, especially in British English, when emphasizing the individual members. Examples of acceptable and unacceptable use given by Gowers in Plain Words include:

Concrete nouns and abstract nouns 

Concrete nouns refer to physical entities that can, in principle at least (i.e. different schools of philosophy and sciences may question the assumption, but, for the most part, people agree to the existence of something. E.g. a rock, a tree,  universe), be observed by at least one of the senses (for instance, chair, apple, Janet or atom). Abstract nouns, on the other hand, refer to abstract objects; that is, ideas or concepts (such as justice or hatred). While this distinction is sometimes exclusive, some nouns have multiple senses, including both concrete and abstract ones: for example, the noun art, which usually refers to a concept (e.g., Art is an important element of human culture.) but which can refer to a specific artwork in certain contexts (e.g., I put my daughter's art up on the fridge.)

Some abstract nouns developed etymologically by figurative extension from literal roots. These include drawback, fraction, holdout and uptake. Similarly, some nouns have both abstract and concrete senses, with the latter having developed by figurative extension from the former. These include view, filter, structure and key.

In English, many abstract nouns are formed by adding a suffix (-ness, -ity, -ion) to adjectives or verbs. Examples are happiness (from the adjective happy), circulation (from the verb circulate) and serenity (from the adjective serene).

Alienable vs. inalienable nouns 

Some languages, such as the Awa language spoken in Papua New Guinea, refer to nouns differently, depending on how ownership is being given for the given noun. This can be broken into two categories: alienable possession and inalienable possession. An alienably possessed noun is something that can exist independent of a possessor: for example 'tree' can be possessed ('Lucy's tree') but need not be ('the tree'), and likewise for 'shirt' ('Mike's shirt', 'that shirt') and 'roads' ('London's roads', 'those roads') . Inalienablly possessed nouns, on the other hand, refer to something that does not exist independently of a possessor; this includes kin terms such as 'father', body-part nouns such as 'shadow' or 'hair', and part-whole nouns such as 'top' and 'bottom'.

Noun phrases 

A noun phrase is a phrase based on a noun, pronoun, or other noun-like words (nominal) optionally accompanied by modifiers such as determiners and adjectives. A noun phrase functions within a clause or sentence in a role such as that of subject, object, or complement of a verb or preposition. For example, in the sentence "The black cat sat on a dear friend of mine", the noun phrase the black cat serves as the subject, and the noun phrase a dear friend of mine serves as the complement of the preposition on.

Nouns in relation to other word classes

Pronouns

Nouns and noun phrases can typically be replaced by pronouns, such as he, it, she, they, these which, and those, in order to avoid repetition or explicit identification, or for other reasons. For example, in the sentence Gareth thought that he was weird, the word "he" is a pronoun standing in place of the person's name. The word one can replace parts of noun phrases, and it sometimes stands in for a noun.  An example is given below:

But one can also stand in for larger parts of a noun phrase. For example, in the following example, one can stand in for new car.

Nominalization

Nominalization is a process whereby a word that belongs to another part of speech comes to be used as a noun. This can be a way to create new nouns, or to use other words in ways that resemble nouns. In French and Spanish, for example, adjectives frequently act as nouns referring to people who have the characteristics denoted by the adjective. This sometimes happens in English as well, as in the following examples:

See also 
 Description
 Grammatical case
 Phi features
 Punctuation
 Reference

Notes

References

Bibliography

Further reading 
 Laycock, Henry (2005). "Mass nouns, Count nouns and Non-count nouns", Draft version of entry in Encyclopedia of Language and Linguistics Oxford: Elsevier.

For definitions of nouns based on the concept of "identity criteria":
 Geach, Peter. 1962. Reference and Generality. Cornell University Press.

For more on identity criteria:
 Gupta, Anil. 1980, The logic of common nouns. New Haven and London: Yale University Press.

For the concept that nouns are "prototypically referential":
 Croft, William. 1993. "A noun is a noun is a noun — or is it? Some reflections on the universality of semantics". Proceedings of the Nineteenth Annual Meeting of the Berkeley Linguistics Society, ed. Joshua S. Guenter, Barbara A. Kaiser and Cheryl C. Zoll, 369–80. Berkeley: Berkeley Linguistics Society.

For an attempt to relate the concepts of identity criteria and prototypical referentiality:
 Baker, Mark. 2003, Lexical Categories: verbs, nouns, and adjectives. Cambridge University Press, Cambridge.

External links 

 Nouns – Nouns described by The Idioms Dictionary.

Grammar
Parts of speech
Autological words